Thomas John Lieb (October 28, 1899 – April 30, 1962) was an American Olympic track and field athlete, an All-American college football player and a multi-sport collegiate coach.  Lieb was a Minnesota native and an alumnus of the University of Notre Dame, where he played college football.  He was best known as the head coach of the Loyola Marymount University and University of Florida football teams.

College sports career 

Tom Lieb was born in Faribault, Minnesota in 1899.  In high school, Lieb excelled at baseball, football, ice hockey, and track and field. He attended the University of Notre Dame in South Bend, Indiana, where he lettered in all four sports and twice received All-American football honors.  During the 1922 season, Lieb broke his leg in the game against Purdue.  While doing his graduate studies at the university, he coached the Notre Dame hockey and track & field teams, and also coached the linemen for the Fighting Irish football team under head coach Knute Rockne.

Lieb was a two-time National Collegiate Athletics Association (NCAA) national collegiate champion in the discus in 1922 and 1923, and the Amateur Athletic Union (AAU) national open champion in 1923 and 1924.  He is widely credited with introducing the modern spin delivery that is still used today.  At the 1924 Summer Olympics held in Paris, France, Lieb competed for the United States in the discus throw and won the bronze medal, but did not equal the distance of his qualifying throw.  Several weeks after the Olympics ended, Lieb broke the discus world record with a throw of 47.61 meters (156 feet 2½ inches).

Coaching career 

Following his graduation, Lieb accepted an offer to coach the linemen for the Wisconsin Badgers.  In 1929, Lieb returned to Notre Dame as the assistant football coach, and was instrumental in directing the Irish to a national championship as Knute Rockne spent most of the season recovering from complications due to thrombophlebitis, a crippling infection of Rockne's leg.

Lieb's coaching success was recognized when he was offered the head coaching position at Loyola University in Los Angeles, California, where he remained from 1930 to 1938.  Lieb relished his role as the Loyola Lions head football coach, posing with lion cubs in publicity photographs, and posted an overall record of 47–33–4.  Lieb also started Loyola's ice hockey program as an off-season conditioning program for his football players, but quickly built the team into a powerhouse with an annual rivalry with the University of Southern California.  From 1935 to 1938, Lieb's hockey Lions won four consecutive Pacific Coast Intercollegiate League titles and compiled a 38–3–2 record.  Lieb quit his coaching job at Loyola during his wife's illness in 1939, and then decided to leave California after she died.

In 1940, Lieb succeeded Josh Cody as the head football coach at the University of Florida in Gainesville, Florida, with high expectations based on his prior successes with Notre Dame and Loyola.  He also served as Florida's athletic director.  Lieb, however, was unable to duplicate the same level of success with the Gators that he had at Notre Dame and Loyola.  In his five seasons of coaching the Florida Gators football team from 1940 to 1945, Lieb compiled a 20–26–1 record, and his contract was not renewed after the 1945 season.  Thereafter, Lieb worked as the assistant Crimson Tide football coach and head track & field coach at the University of Alabama, where his old Notre Dame teammate Frank Thomas was the head football coach, from 1946 to 1951.

Life after football 

When Lieb retired in 1951, he returned to Los Angeles, where he became a public speaker.  He died of an apparent heart attack in 1962 at age 62.  He was elected to the Loyola Marymount Hall of Fame posthumously in 1987.

Head coaching record

Football

Ice hockey

See also
 List of Olympic medalists in athletics (men)
 List of University of Notre Dame alumni
 List of University of Notre Dame athletes

References

Bibliography 

  2012 Florida Football Media Guide, University Athletic Association, Gainesville, Florida (2012).
 Carlson, Norm, University of Florida Football Vault: The History of the Florida Gators, Whitman Publishing, LLC, Atlanta, Georgia (2007).  .
 Golenbock, Peter, Go Gators!  An Oral History of Florida's Pursuit of Gridiron Glory, Legends Publishing, LLC, St. Petersburg, Florida (2002).  .
 McCarthy, Kevin M.,  Fightin' Gators: A History of University of Florida Football, Arcadia Publishing, Mount Pleasant, South Carolina (2000).  .
 McEwen, Tom, The Gators: A Story of Florida Football, The Strode Publishers, Huntsville, Alabama (1974).  .
 Nash, Noel, ed., The Gainesville Sun Presents The Greatest Moments in Florida Gators Football, Sports Publishing, Inc., Champaign, Illinois (1998).  .
 Proctor, Samuel, & Wright Langley, Gator History: A Pictorial History of the University of Florida, South Star Publishing Company, Gainesville, Florida (1986).  .

External links
 

1899 births
1962 deaths
Alabama Crimson Tide football coaches
All-American college football players
American male discus throwers
American football tackles
Athletes (track and field) at the 1924 Summer Olympics
Florida Gators athletic directors
Florida Gators football coaches
Loyola Lions football coaches
Notre Dame Fighting Irish football coaches
Notre Dame Fighting Irish football players
Notre Dame Fighting Irish ice hockey coaches
Notre Dame Fighting Irish men's track and field athletes
Olympic bronze medalists for the United States in track and field
People from Faribault, Minnesota
Coaches of American football from Minnesota
Players of American football from Minnesota
Medalists at the 1924 Summer Olympics
Alabama Crimson Tide track and field coaches